Stormsia minima is a species of freshwater snail, an aquatic gastropod mollusk in the family Paludomidae.

Stormsia minima is the only species in the genus Stormsia.

Distribution
Stormsia minima is found in Burundi, the Democratic Republic of the Congo, Tanzania, and Zambia.

Its natural habitat is freshwater lakes.

References

Paludomidae
Gastropods described in 1908
Taxonomy articles created by Polbot